P.C. 369 is a 1987 Indian Malayalam-language film, directed by P. Chandrakumar. The film stars Suresh Gopi, Mukesh, Rohini and Maniyanpilla Raju. The film has musical score by K. P. N. Pillai.

Cast
Suresh Gopi as Gopikuttan
Mukesh as Johnny Varghese 
Rohini as Sudha 
Maniyanpilla Raju as P.C. Damodharan Pilla
Saritha as P.C. Elsamma Mathew
T. G. Ravi as H.C. Cheenkanni Vasu Kurup
Vijayaraghavan as Johnny's brother
Santha Devi as Mandara
Oduvil Unnikrishnan as Adv. Swaminathan / Dr. Viswanathan / Prof. Kashinathan

Soundtrack
The music was composed by K. P. N. Pillai with lyrics by Chowalloor Krishnankutty and Dr K. Narayanankutty.

References

External links
 

1987 films
1980s Malayalam-language films
Films directed by P. Chandrakumar